Ismelda Yaneth Cruz Alvarado (born 29 May 1996) is a Salvadoran footballer who plays as a forward for CD Municipal Limeño and the El Salvador national team.

Club career
Cruz has played for Limeño in El Salvador.

International career
Cruz made her senior debut for El Salvador on 8 April 2021 as a 88th-minute substitution in a 0–2 friendly home loss to Nicaragua.

See also
List of El Salvador women's international footballers

References

1996 births
Living people
Salvadoran women's footballers
Women's association football midfielders
El Salvador women's international footballers